Manaba Beach is a seaside village on the South Coast of the KwaZulu-Natal province of South Africa. The name means 'ease and relaxation' in the Zulu language.

Geography 
Manaba Beach is situated approximately 2.5 km north-east of Margate's Central Business District (CBD) and 13 km south-west of Port Shepstone.

Manaba Beach is one of the many suburbs or extensions of the larger town of Margate and lies between Margate North Beach to the south-west and Uvongo to the north-east.

Economy 
Manaba Beach is one of the smaller economic centres of the KwaZulu-Natal South Coast and has many retail and hardware stores and motor repair centres which are mainly strung along its main road, Marine Drive. Manaba Beach is also popular amongst  residents on the Lower South Coast for the Kwikspar Hopdens on Marine Drive which is one of the largest SPAR supermarkets in the region.  

Other than retail, another notable employer in Manaba Beach is Albany's (one of South Africa's largest bread companies) Margate bakery located on Marine Drive.

Beach 
The Manaba Beach vicinity consists of two beaches, Lucien and Manaba Beach. Lucien Beach is the blue flag beach on the north end of Margate Beach. Manaba Beach has lifeguards and also has shark nets which makes it a safe swimming beach. Margate Main Beach just south of Lucien Beach is also within easy access for residents of Manaba Beach. 

There are also natural rock pools along the rocks between these two beaches there is also a large tidal swimming pool. 

Despite being a commercial centre, Manaba Beach is also a seaside resort area and has many self-catering holiday accommodation flats along the beach.

Roads
The R620 named Marine Drive passes through Manaba Beach as the main thoroughfare for the suburb. The road links Manaba to Margate Central, Ramsgate, Southbroom and Port Edward (via the R61/N2) to the south and Uvongo, Shelly Beach and Port Shepstone to the north. 

The R61/N2 highway bypasses Manaba Beach to the west and links to Port Edward to the south-west and Port Shepstone and Durban to the north-east. Access to the R61/N2 from Manaba Beach can be obtained through the Exit 33 off-ramp which is linked by Seaslopes Avenue just north of the village.

References 

Margate
Populated places in KwaZulu-Natal